Hyperdrama is a dramatic performance generated by playscripts written in hypertext. The performance is noted for its split narrative with scenes branching to play simultaneously in an expanded performance space. The audience is mobile, able to follow actors and watch scenes as each individual chooses.

Several universities added the study of Hyperdrama to their hypertext and electronic media studies, including the University of Virginia, Tunxis Community College, and New York University,.

Description 
According to Astrid Ensslin in her book Canonizing Hypertext(Continuum, London, 2007), the term hyperdrama "was coined by hyperdramatist and theorist Charles Deemer, who understands 'traditional drama as a special case of hyperdrama' (p27)." Ensslin places Deemer's one-act hyperdrama The Last Song of Violeta Parra in the canon of "first generation hypertext."

Hannah Rudman, who wrote "The Benefactor: a Hyperdrama" in 1998 with Billy Smart, describes the form this way: "A hyperdrama is a play that is written in hypertext, that is performed as a promenade and that is realised on multiple levels. Scenes happen simultaneously throughout a performance space. In this hyperdrama, there are five different locations where the action takes place. The scripts for the different locations are divided into levels which represent the time span of the piece (about 45 minutes real time). All the characters and locations in this hyperdrama are of equal importance. As a reader, you could follow the path of one character through the play by clicking on their hypertext links; read all the separate scripts in a linear fashion; or explore the hyperdrama more randomly by swapping between rooms via the hotlinks."Discussion of hyperdrama is included in the book Theatre In Cyberspace (Peter Lang, 1999): "theatre practitioners are increasing their potential audiences with online technology while attempting to discover how to present theatre in an interactive yet non-corporeal way. Also fascinating is how educators and practitioners can collaborate, creating online performance spaces that can be adapted for teaching, and creating online teaching techniques that can be adapted for performance. This volume of essays presents information from some of the pioneers in the field of cyberspace theatre who write of their work in both theoretical and practical terms, thus creating a kind of Theatre and Its Double for computers and theatre."

Productions 
Deemer wrote a hyperdrama expansion of Chekhov's The Seagull.

In 2009, the American Repertory Theater and Punchdrunk performed Sleep No More, "a hyperdrama rendition of Macbeth with a creepy, Hitchcock feel."

Russell Anderson, author of Woyzeck: a Hyperdrama, calls his play "a performance in the ‘hyperdrama’ format: that is, where multiple elements of performance occur in multiple locations simultaneously."

Tegan Zimmerman uses the presentation software Prezi to explore "Hypertext and Hyperdrama" and their relationship online.

Other hyperdrama works of note are Tamara by John Krizanc and Tony n' Tina's Wedding.

See also
Dramatic theory
Tamara (play)
Punchdrunk (theatre company)
Sleep No More

References

External links 

 The Benefactor: a Hyperdrama"
 hyperdrama

Further reading
 Changing Key: a video hyperdrama lecture-demonstration.

part of an MA Thesis on Hyperdrama
 

Drama